Kler Çaku (born 4 April 2010) is an Albanian chess player.

Career
She won the 2021 Albanian Women's Chess Championship, aged 11, finishing half a point ahead of 14 times Albania champion Eglantina Shabanaj.
 
She is an Arena International Master. In February 2021 she was a winner of the Worldwide Junior Chess Festival, held on the Lichess platform.

In July 2021 Kler Çaku won the online tournament “Rudaga-Kaissa 2021” in the Girls U12 category.

In July 2022, the European Youth Blitz Champions were crowned in Thessaloniki and chess player Kler Çaku finished the event in the third place with 12 points.

From 29.07.2022 to 09.08.2022 she played first time for Albania Team at 44th Chess Olympiad 2022 Women on third table, scoring 5 points in 10 games played. She got conditional Woman Candidate Chess Master (WCM). 

In september 2022, Kler Çaku played in Balkan Youth Chess Championship 2022 and won Gold Medal for Girls U12 in Standard, Gold Medal in Blitz Tournament for U12 and Silver Medal in Rapid Tournament for Girls U12.

In November 2022, the European Youth Chess Champions 2022 were crowned in Antalya, Turkey and chess player Kler Çaku finished the event in the fifth place, scoring 6.5 points in 9 games played with no defeats. 

In 21 to 25 february 2023, Kler Çaku won the event 1 WR CHESS JUNIORS 2023 holded in Düsseldorf, scoring 4.5 points in 5 games played.

References 

Albanian female chess players
2010 births
Living people